Luther McKinnon was the seventh president of Davidson College and the first alumnus to become president. After graduating as salutatorian from Davidson in 1861, McKinnon joined the Confederate States Army as a chaplain. McKinnon became ill after becoming president, struck with what was described as "rheumatism," and resigned as president. McKinnon lived as an invalid for the rest of life, settling in Clinton, North Carolina.

References 

Presidents of Davidson College
1840 births
1916 deaths
People from Maxton, North Carolina
People from Clinton, North Carolina